In the 1844 Iowa Territory Council elections, electors selected councilors to serve in the seventh Iowa Territory Council. All 13 members of the Territory Council were elected. Councilors served one-year terms.

The Iowa Territory existed from July 4, 1838, until December 28, 1846, when Iowa was admitted to the Union as a state. At the time, the Iowa Territory had a Legislative Assembly consisting of an upper chamber (i.e., the Territory Council) and a lower chamber (i.e., the Territory House of Representatives).

Following the previous election in 1843, Democrats held a majority with seven seats to Whigs' six seats. During the sixth session of the Territory Council, Councilor Cox died, causing a vacancy in a Democratic Party seat. Therefore, on election day in 1844, the Democrats and Whigs both had six seats each.

To claim a majority of seats, the Whigs needed to net one seat from Democrats.

Democrats maintained a majority of seats in the Iowa Territory Council following the 1844 general election with the balance of power shifting to Democrats holding 11 seats and Whigs having two seats (a net gain of 5 seat for Democrats, including regaining the vacant seat). Democratic Councilor Serranus Clinton Hastings was chosen as the President of the seventh Territory Council to succeed the deceased Democratic Councilor Thomas Cox in that leadership position.

Summary of Results 

Source:

Detailed Results
NOTE: The Iowa General Assembly does not contain detailed vote totals for Territory Council elections in 1844.

See also
 Elections in Iowa

External links
District boundaries for the Iowa Territory Council were redrawn before the 1844 general election:
Iowa Territory Council Districts 1840-1844 map
Iowa Territory Council Districts 1845-1846 map

References

Iowa Council
Iowa
Iowa Senate elections